Rampage: The Hillside Strangler Murders is a 2006 American direct-to-video crime thriller about the Hillside Strangler murders. The film featured Brittany Daniel, Lake Bell and Michelle Borth, with Tomas Arana and Clifton Collins Jr. playing the killers Angelo Buono and Kenneth Bianchi, respectively. It was directed by Chris Fisher.

Plot
Kenneth Bianchi, one of the two serial rapists and killers (along with his cousin Angelo Buono) who terrorized the Los Angeles area in the late 1970s, is giving police station interviews to psychiatrist Dr. Samantha Stone who has disquieting lifestyle issues of her own. It falls to her to delve into the details of the case to determine the veracity of Bianchi's claims of multiple personality disorder, but in so doing, she is forced to relive the horrific crimes, one of which occurs at her very doorstep.

Cast
 Brittany Daniel as Dr. Samantha Stone, Psychiatrist
 Lake Bell as Jillian Dunne
 Michelle Borth as Nicole
 Tomas Arana as Angelo Buono
 Clifton Collins Jr. as Kenneth Bianchi
 Joleigh Fioravanti (credited as Joleigh Pulsonetti) as Tanya 
 Bret Roberts as Jack 
 Mike Hagerty as Detective Smith
 Mikal Kartvedt as Swat Officer
 Eddie Jemison as Kantor 
 Stephen R. Hudis as Swat Captain

Production
Started production in 2004 but was held back. The role of Jack was specifically written for Bret Roberts. Vincent Pastore was offered the part of Angelo Buono. When he had to decline, Tomas Arana got the part. Claire Forlani was also considered for the part of Samantha Stone.

Directed primarily with a hand-held camera by Chris Fisher. Filming took place in Valencia, California and was Shot in only 15 days.

Reception
The film received negative reviews. On IMDb, it holds an average score of 4.2/10, with the critical consensus being that the script and acting were melodramatic and that it wasn't scary enough to be a thriller.

See also
The Hillside Strangler (film)

References

External links

2006 direct-to-video films
2006 films
American crime thriller films
American serial killer films
2000s crime thriller films
American films based on actual events
Films directed by Chris Fisher
Films set in Los Angeles
Films shot in Los Angeles County, California
Crime films based on actual events
2000s English-language films
2000s American films